Anti-Zionism is opposition to Zionism. Although anti-Zionism is a heterogeneous phenomenon, all its proponents agree that the creation of the modern State of Israel, and the movement to create a sovereign Jewish state in the region of Palestine – the biblical Land of Israel – was flawed or unjust in some way.

Until World War II, anti-Zionism was widespread among Jews for varying reasons. Orthodox Jews opposed Zionism on religious grounds, as preempting the Messiah, while secular Jews felt uncomfortable with the idea that Jewish peoplehood was a national or ethnic identity. Opposition to Zionism in the Jewish diaspora was surmounted only from the 1930s onward, as conditions for Jews deteriorated radically in Europe and, with the Second World War, the sheer scale of the Holocaust struck home. Thereafter, Jewish anti-Zionist groups generally either disintegrated or transformed into pro-Zionist organizations, though many small groups, and bodies like the American Council for Judaism, conserved an earlier Reform tradition of rejection of Zionism. Non-Jewish anti-Zionism likewise spanned communal and religious groups, with the Arab population of Palestine largely opposed to what it considered the colonial dispossession of its homeland. Opposition to Zionism was, and continues to be, widespread in the Arab world, especially among Palestinians.

Zionism's proponents note its success in establishing the Jewish state of Israel in the region of Palestine, and seek to portray anti-Zionism as broad opposition to Israel and a Jewish presence in the region. Supporters of Zionism often highlight that some antisemites hold anti-Zionist views. The relationship between Zionism, anti-Zionism and antisemitism is debated, with some academics and organizations that study antisemitism taking the view that anti-Zionism is inherently antisemitic or new antisemitism, while others reject any such linkage as unfounded and a method to stifle criticism of Israel and its policies, including its occupation of the West Bank.

Anti-Zionism before 1948

Early Jewish anti-Zionism
Formal anti-Zionism arose in the late 19th century as a response to Theodor Herzl's proposal in The Jewish State (1896) to create an independent country in Palestine for Jews subject to persecution in the "civilized nations" of Europe, but even before Herzl, the idea of Zionism – of Jews as constituting a nation rather than a people constituted by their religion – promoted by Moses Hess (1862) and Leo Pinsker (1882) elicited fierce opposition within European Orthodox Jewry. Samson Raphael Hirsch, for one, considered the active promotion of Jewish emigration to Palestine a sin. The creation of a Jewish state before the appearance of the messiah was widely interpreted in Jewish religious circles as contradicting the divine will, a programme, furthermore, that was visibly driven by Jewish secularists. Until World War I, across Central Europe, Jewish religious leaders largely perceived the Zionist movement's aspirations for Jewish nationhood in a distant "New Judea" as a threat, in that it might encourage paradoxically the very antisemites, with their treatment of Jews in their midst as "aliens", whose fundamental rationale Zionism itself sought to undermine.

When Herzl began to propound his proposal, many, including, secular Jews, regarded Zionism as a fanciful and unrealistic movement. Some antisemites even dismissed it as a "Jewish trick". Many assimilationist Jewish liberals, heirs of the Enlightenment, had argued that Jews should enjoy full equality in exchange for a pledge of loyalty to their respective nation-states. Those liberal Jews who accepted integration and assimilationist principles saw Zionism as a threat to efforts to facilitate Jewish citizenship and equality within the European nation-state context. Many in the intellectual elite of the Anglo-Jewish community, for example, opposed Zionism because they felt most at home in England, where, in their view, antisemitism was neither a social or cultural norm. The Jewish establishment in Germany, France (and its Alliance Israelite Universelle), and America strongly identified with its respective states, a sentiment that made it regard Zionism negatively. Reform rabbis in German-speaking lands and Hungary advocated the erasure of all mentions of Zion in their prayer books. Herzl's successor, the Zionist atheist Max Nordau, whose views on race coincided with those of the antisemitic Drumont, lambasted Reform Judaism for emptying ancient Jewish prayers of their literal meaning in claiming that the Jewish diaspora was a fact of destiny.

Herzl's proposal initially met with broad, vigorous opposition within Jewish intellectual, social and political movements. A notable exception was the religious Mizrachi movement. Among left-wing currents within diaspora Jewish communities, strong opposition emerged in such formations as the Bundism, Autonomism, Folkism, Jewish Communists, Territorialism, and Jewish-language anarchist movements. Yevsektsiya, the Jewish section of the Communist Party in the Soviet Union created to combat "Jewish bourgeois nationalism", targeted the Zionist movement and managed to close down its offices and place Zionist literature under a ban, but Soviet officials themselves often disapproved of anti-Zionist zeal.

Early Arab anti-Zionism

Arabs began paying attention to Zionism in the late Ottoman period. As early as 1905, the Maronite Christian Naguib Azoury, in his The Awakening of the Arab Nation, warned that the "Jewish people" were engaged in a concerted drive to establish a country in the area they believed was their homeland. Subsequently, the Palestinian Christian-owned and highly influential newspaper Falastin was founded in 1911 in the then Arab-majority city of Jaffa and soon became the area's fiercest and most consistent critic of the Zionist movement. It helped shape Palestinian identity and nationalism.

Palestinian and broader Arab anti-Zionism took a decisive turn, and became a serious force, with the November 1917 publication of the Balfour Declaration – which arguably emerged from an antisemitic milieu – in the face of strenuous resistance from two anti-Zionists, Lord Curzon and Edwin Montagu, then the (Jewish) Secretary of State for India. Other than assuring civil equality for all future Palestinians regardless of creed, it promised diaspora Jews territorial rights to Palestine, where, according to the 1914 Ottoman census of its citizens, 83% were Muslim, 11.2% Christian, and 5% Jewish.  The majority Muslim and Christian population constituting 94% of the citizenry only had their "religious rights" recognized.

Given that Arab notables were almost unanimous in repudiating Zionism, and incidents like the massacre at Al-Sarafand stirred deep resentment against the British throughout the area, the British army view, confided to American officers with the King–Crane Commission, was that the provisions for Zionism could only be implemented by military force. To this end, the army calculated that a standing army of at least 50,000 troops would be required to implement the Zionist project on Palestinian soil. According to Henry Laurens, uneasiness over this task by a colonial army that had been accustomed to treat and defend colonial populations in a quasi-feudal/paternalistic manner, accounts for much of the hostility the British army in Palestine was to feel toward Zionists.

Reactions to the Balfour Declaration

American approval of the Declaration came about through the direct and secret mediation of the antisemitic anti-Zionist Colonel House with President Woodrow Wilson by bypassing Robert Lansing, the United States Secretary of State. The last sentence in the draft proposal passed to Wilson, mentioning Jews "who are fully contented with their existing nationality and citizenship", was struck from the final British version. This recognition by Wilson stirred great anxieties among numerous leaders of the American Jewish community, which had made the adoption of its country a "theological substitution for the return to Zion" and was highly satisfied with its prosperous lives in this "new Zion". 299 prominent rabbis registered their disapproval in a submission to the forthcoming Paris Peace Conference, rebuffing the notion that there could ever be a Jewish Palestine. When he found out, Lansing thought that Zionism contradicted Wilson's own declared principle of self-determination for the peoples of the world. One other effect was that of laying the grounds for an anti-Zionist tradition in the US State Department.

Once the Occupied Enemy Territory Administration (OETA) began to implement the Balfour Declaration, both sides had reason to accuse the authorities of partisanship. Several contemporary sources credit the notion that English administrators were partial to Arabs, and diffident about, if not outright disliking, Jews. One Zionist complaint was that among the higher functionaries of the British Mandatory administration were several officials who countenanced anti-Zionist and even antisemitic policies. The energetic arguments of Jacob Israël de Haan on behalf of sectors of the Orthodox yishuv who disagreed with Zionism also played an important role in getting Mandate authorities to grasp that Zionists did not represent the entire Palestinian Jewish community. The Haganah assassinated him in 1924.

The British press during the Mandate period was often critical – the Northcliffe Press was openly anti-Zionist, and the newspaper baron Lord Beaverbrook was opposed to the Mandate itself – and complaints were made of the heavy burden it was to govern the land with competing national interests. It was claimed that Zionism's promise of a homeland for the Jewish people with civil rights for its Arab citizens was impossible to realize. Much of this anti-Zionist sentiment and diffidence about Jews in the early Mandate years, limited in scope like British antisemitism, was also tinged with anti-Bolshevism, since the Russian revolution had earlier engendered a sharp spike in antisemitism in the British press. Official sponsorship of Zionism, as evidenced by the Balfour Declaration, had been influenced by the communist takeover of Russia, which Anglo-Jewry itself abhorred, in which Jews were alleged to have played a major role. Palestinians raised the spectre of possible communist infiltration in the guise of Zionism before the horrified British administration with some success.

OETA and the British government took these claims seriously and addressed them in the Palin Commission report in August 1920, an investigation into the reasons behind the subsequent anti-Zionist riots at Nebi Musa. The Commission found that there was a widespread perception among the Arabs, reflected also among British residents and officials, that that the Zionists' attitudes and zealous behaviour exacerbated hostilities, being perceived as "arrogant, insolent and provocative."

Anti-Zionism in the 1920s-1930s
Some members of the Jewish-Marxist Poale Zion, which advocated under Ber Borochov a separate Zionist organization for Jewish workers and advocated emigration to Palestine as a solution to antisemitism, found to their surprise on making aliyah that Palestine was a predominantly Arab country. By the early 1920s, the realization that Zionism would be discriminatory had turned Poale militants like Yaakov Meiersohn and Joseph Berger into anti-Zionists. In 1922 the Comintern's disowning of Poale Zion spurred the growth of a Jewish anti-Zionist left in Palestine, culminating with the formation of the Palestine Communist Party (PCP), which retained some residual Zionist traces. This anti-Zionist Jewish PCP was recognized by the Comintern in 1924, and, that same year, the first Palestinian Arab joined the party.

The Yiddish-speaking General Jewish Labor Union of Eastern Europe, the largest Jewish left-wing organization in Europe between the two wars, focused on a practice of doykayt (hereness) as the key to Jewish identity; that is, it advocated addressing practical issues Jews faced all over the diaspora in their respective national contexts. It dismissed its antagonist Zionism's vision of resolving matters definitively by emigrating to Palestine as marked by a "separatist, chauvinist, clerical and conservative" outlook, values diametrically opposed to Bundism's secular, progressive and internationalist principles.

The Communist Party of the USA (CPUSA) was resolutely anti-Zionist throughout this period through to 1947, seeing it as embedded in an imperial British colonialist oppression of the Arab masses. Under its general secretrary Earl Browder, a clear distinction was drawn between pogroms in Europe, which were likened to what hate groups like the Ku Klux Klan and Black Legion practiced in America, and the Arab resistance to Jewish settlers in Palestine. At the time around half of the CPUSA's membership was Jewish, with perhaps 10% of the American Jewish population joining the movement over a decade. Throughout the 1930s and 40s, members of the American Jewish left and its intelligentsia were almost all anti-Zionists, the exception being Meyer Levin. Mike Gold's 1930 novel Jews without Money, which depicts a Zionist entrepreneur's fatal extortion of a poor Jew, can be read as a proletarian critique of both American capitalism and, tacitly in its subplot, of Zionist practices in Palestine.

As well as left-wing critiques of Zionism, many mainstream liberal and conservative communal organisations in the diaspora continued to promote an assimilationist anti-Zionism. In Germany, for example, the Centralverein deutscher Staatsbürger jüdischen Glaubens (Central Union of German Citizens of Jewish Faith) argued that German Jews should be primarily loyal to Germany and identify as Jews only on religious terms. Soon after Hitler was appointed Chancellor in January 1933, Jews, and anti-Zionists among them, were galvanized to organize global protests against the new regime's discrimination against their German confreres.

Similarly, as Italian fascism came to identify Zionism with enemies of the country abroad, in 1934 the Italian-Israeli Community Union responded to pressure by solemnly affirming the community's allegiance to their country. Italian anti-Zionists such as Ettore Ovazza reacted by creating their own newspaper, La Nostra Bandiera (Our Flag), whose editorial line maintained that the establishment of a Jewish nation in Palestine was anachronistic.

The Biltmore programme and its anti-Zionism fall-out
In May 1942, before the full revelation of the Holocaust, the Biltmore Program proclaimed a radical departure from traditional Zionist policy by adopting a maximalist position in calling for the creation of a Jewish commonwealth in an unpartitioned Palestine to resolve the issue of Jewish homelessness. At the American Jewish Conference in late August-early September the following year, Zionists received 85% as opposed to 5% for the anti-Zionists. Opposition to official Zionism's firm, unequivocal stand caused some prominent Zionists to establish their own party, Ichud (Unification), which advocated an Arab–Jewish Federation in Palestine.  Ichud represented a very small minority of Jewish Palestine; there were only 97 party members in 1943. Opposition to the Biltmore Program also led to the founding of the anti-Zionist American Council for Judaism, which, according to Noam Chomsky was the only Jewish group in America immediately after WW2 to lobby for the immigration of Jewish Holocaust-survivors to the United States, rather than Palestine.

Religious
Orthodox Judaism, which stressed civic responsibilities and patriotic feelings in religion, was strongly opposed to Zionism because Zionism espoused nationalism in a secular fashion and used "Zion", "Jerusalem", "Land of Israel", "redemption" and "ingathering of exiles" as literal rather than sacred terms, endeavouring to achieve them in this world. According to Menachem Keren-Kratz, the situation in the United States differed, with most Reform rabbis and laypeople endorsing Zionism. Dina Porat holds the opposite view of Orthodox Jewish opinion generally.

Elaborating on the work of David N. Myers, Jonathan Judaken states that "numerous Jewish traditions have insisted that preservation of what is most precious about Judaism and Jewishness 'demands' a principled anti-Zionism or post-Zionism." This tradition dwindled in the aftermath of the Holocaust and the establishment of Israel, but is still alive in religious groups such as Neturei Karta and among many intellectuals of Jewish background in Israel and the diaspora, such as George Steiner, Tony Judt and Baruch Kimmerling.

Anti-Zionism after World War II and the creation of Israel
There was a shift in the meaning of anti-Zionism after the events of the 1940s.  Whereas pre-1948 anti-Zionism was against the hypothetical establishment of a Jewish state in Palestine, post-1948 anti-Zionism had to contend with the existence of the State of Israel.  This often meant taking a retaliatory position to the new reality of Jewish sovereignty in the Middle East.  The overriding impulse of post-1948 anti-Zionism is to dismantle the current State of Israel and replace it with something else.

1947-1948
On the eve of the foundation of Israel in 1948, Judah Magnes, president of Jerusalem's Hebrew University, adopted an anti-Zionist position in opposing the imminent estabishment of a Jewish State. His opposition was grounded on a view, anticipated in the 1930s by Arthur Ruppin, that such a state would automatically entail a situation of continuous warfare with the Arab world, an inference Moshe Dayan later endorsed.

Soviet Union

By 1948, when the Soviet Union recognized Israel, Jewish institutional life within its borders had been effectively dismantled. The Soviet Union nonetheless played a leading role in recognizing the state of Israel, was harshly critical of Arab states opposing it and enabled Israel to procure substantial armaments in 1948–1949. However, at roughly the same time, in early 1948, Ilya Ehrenburg had been co-opted to write an article for Pravda which set forth what was later to become the authoritative rationale for Soviet hostility to Zionism, as aspiring to create a dwarfish state of capitalism. Virulent antisemitism, particularly after the fabricated Doctors' plot affair in 1953, and with clear parallels to the content of The Protocols of the Elders of Zion, came to the fore, conflating anti-Zionism and antisemitism despite the conceptual distinction between the two. A deep-seated antisemitic strain within Russian culture influencing the Soviet state's approach to events in the Middle Easts emerged to intensify the Soviet leadership's anti-Zionist hostility towards Israel as a major threat to the communist world, especially in the aftermath of the Six-Day War, when official documents and party connivance resuscitated antisemitic imagery related to Zionism.

Two waves of mass Russian-Jewish immigration to Israel, the Soviet Union aliyah and 1990s post-Soviet aliyah, took place from the 1970s onwards. According to Anthony Julius, in 1989, "Soviet anti-Zionism was credibly considered the greatest threat to Israel and Jews generally. ... This 'anti-Zionism' survived the collapse of the Soviet system." In the 21st century, factions within American academia have supported boycotts of Israel using language that is Soviet in origin.

Arab and Palestinian anti-Zionism
In a retrospective analysis of Arab anti-Zionism in 1978, Yehoshafat Harkabi argued, in a view reflected in the works of the anti-Zionist Russian-Jewish orientalist Maxime Rodinson, that Arab hostility to Zionism arose as a rational response in historical context to a genuine threat, and, with the establishment of Israel, their anti-Zionism was shaped as much by Israeli policies and actions as by traditional antisemitic stereotypes, and only later degenerated into an irrational attitude. Anne de Jong asserts that direct resistance to Zionism from inhabitants of historical Palestine "focused less on religious arguments and was instead centered on countering the experience of colonial dispossession and opposing the Zionist enforcement of ethnic division of the indigenous population."

Until 1948, according to Derek Penslar, antisemitism in Palestine "grew directly out of the conflict with the Zionist movement and its gradual yet purposeful settlement of the country," rather than the European model vision of Jews as the cause of all the ills of mankind. According to Anthony Julius, anti-Zionism, a highly heterogeneous phenomenon, and Palestinian nationalism, are separate ideologies; one need not have an opinion on the Israeli–Palestinian conflict to be an anti-Zionist.

One Arab criticism of Zionism is that Islamic–Jewish relations were entirely peaceful until Zionism conquered Arab lands. Arab delegates to the United Nations also claimed that Zionists had unethically enticed Arab Jews to come to Israel. According to Gil Troy, neither claim is historically accurate as Jews did not have the same rights as Muslims in these lands and had periodically experienced violent riots.

Allegations of racism

During the Cold War
In the 1960s and 1970s, the Soviets and Americans interpreted the Arab–Israeli conflict as a proxy war between the totalitarianism of the Soviet–Arab alliance and the democracies of the Western world. The Israeli victory in the Six-Day War of 1967 necessitated a diplomatic response by the Soviet–Arab alliance. The result were resolutions in the Organization for African Unity and the Non-Aligned Movement condemning Zionism and equating it with racism and apartheid during the early 1970s.

This culminated in November 1975 in the United Nations General Assembly's passage of Resolution 3379 by a vote of 72 to 35 (with 32 abstentions), which declared, "Zionism is a form of racism, and racial discrimination". The passage evoked, in the words of American UN Ambassador Daniel Patrick Moynihan, "a long mocking applause." UN representatives from Libya, Syria, and the PLO made speeches claiming that this resolution negated previous resolutions calling for land-for-peace agreements between Israel and its Arab neighbors. Israel's UN representative Chaim Herzog interpreted the resolution as an attack on Israel's legitimacy. African UN delegates from non-Arab countries also resented the resolution as a distraction from the fight against racism in places like South Africa and Rhodesia.

The decision was revoked on 16 December 1991, when the General Assembly passed Resolution 4686, repealing resolution 3379, by a vote of 111 to 25, with 13 abstentions and 17 delegations absent. Thirteen of the 19 Arab countries, including those engaged in negotiations with Israel, voted against the repeal, and another six were absent. All the ex-communist countries and most of the African countries who had supported Resolution 3379 voted to repeal it.

After the Cold War
In 1993, philosopher Cornel West wrote: "Jews will not comprehend what the symbolic predicament and literal plight of Palestinians in Israel means to blacks.... Blacks often perceive the Jewish defense of the state of Israel as a second instance of naked group interest, and, again, an abandonment of substantive moral deliberation." African-American support of Palestinians is frequently due to the consideration of Palestinians as people of color – political scientist Andrew Hacker writes: "The presence of Israel in the Middle East is perceived as thwarting the rightful status of people of color. Some blacks view Israel as essentially a white and European power, supported from the outside, and occupying space that rightfully belongs to the original inhabitants of Palestine."

In January 2015, the Lausanne movement published an article in its official journal comparing Christian Zionism, the crusades, and the Spanish Inquisition, and described Zionism as "apartheid on steroids". The Simon Wiesenthal Center called this last claim "the big lie", and rebutted the "dismissal of the validity of Israel's right to exist as the Jewish State".

Islamism

Anti-Zionist Muslims consider the State of Israel as an intrusion into what Shari'a law defines as Dar al-islam, the Islamic counterpart to the Land of Israel in rabbinical law, and a domain they believe to be rightfully, and permanently, ruled only by Muslims as it was historically conquered in the name of Islam.

Palestinian and other Muslim groups, as well as the government of Iran (since the 1979 Islamic Revolution), insist that the State of Israel is illegitimate and refuse to refer to it as "Israel", instead using the locution "the Zionist entity" (see Iran–Israel relations).  In an interview with Time magazine in December 2006, Mahmoud Ahmadinejad said "Everyone knows that the Zionist regime is a tool in the hands of the United States and British governments." The anti-Zionism of Hamas is indistinguishable from the group's antipathy for Judaism.

Far-right politics

Anti-Zionism has a long history of being supported by various individuals and groups associated with Third Position, right-wing and fascist (or "neo-fascist") political views. A number of militantly racist groups and their leaders are anti-Zionist, such as David Duke, the Ku Klux Klan, and various other Aryan/White-supremacist groups. In these instances, anti-Zionism is usually also deeply antisemitic, and often revolves around conspiracy theories discussed below. The opposite phenomenon, of Zionist/pro-Israel antisemites, has also been documented, often associated with American Christian evangelicals.

Left-wing politics
According to New York University social and cultural theorist Susie Linfield, one of the most pressing questions facing the New Left following World War II was "How can we maintain our traditional universalist values in light of the nationalist movements sweeping the formerly colonized world?"

During the late 1960s, anti-Zionism became a part of a collection of sentiments within the far-left politics including anti-colonialism, anti-capitalism, and anti-Americanism. In this environment, Zionism became a representation of Western power. Indeed, philosopher Jean Améry argued that this "Zionism" that the left opposes is merely a straw man redefinition of the term used to mean world Jewry. The far-left Israeli politician Simha Flapan lamented in 1968, "The socialist world approved the 'Holy War' of the Arabs against Israel in the disguise of a struggle against imperialism.  ... Having agreed to the devaluation of its own ideals, [it] was ready to enter an alliance with reactionary and chauvinist appeals to genocide."

The government of East Germany was passionately anti-Zionist. From the 1950s through the 1970s, East Germany supplied Israel's neighboring Arab states with weapons. Immediately after the Six-Day War in 1967, East German Communist Party chairman Walter Ulbricht claimed that Israel had not been threatened by its neighboring Arab states before the war. He continually compared Israel to Nazi Germany. In 1969, West German left-wing anti-Zionists placed a bomb in a Jewish Community Center.

A series of anti-Zionist aircraft hijackings took place in the 1970s with left-wing groups' support. The most famous of these was the 1976 Air France hijacking perpetrated by the Popular Front for the Liberation of Palestine in coordination with the Revolutionary Cells. The hijackers released all the non-Jewish hostages, but kept all of the Jewish ones for ransom. The separation of Jews from non-Jews shocked many on the German left. To Joschka Fischer, the way the hijackers treated Jews opened his eyes to the violent, Nazi-like implications of anti-Zionism. A few years later, the Revolutionary Cells and another anti-Zionist group attempted to firebomb two German movie theaters that were showing a movie based on the hijacking.

In his much discussed essay Progressive Jewish Thought and the New Anti-Semitism, Alvin H. Rosenfeld wrote that a "number of Jews, through their speaking and writing, are feeding a rise in virulent antisemitism by questioning whether Israel should even exist." Rosenfeld lamented that some left-wing Jews delegitimize Israel "in the name of Judaism" and make false equivalencies between Israel and Nazi Germany or apartheid South Africa.

Some Jewish organizations oppose Zionism as an integral part of their anti-imperialism. Today, some secular Jews, particularly socialists and Marxists, continue to oppose the State of Israel on anti-imperialist and human rights grounds. Many oppose it as a form of nationalism, which they argue to be a product of capitalist societies. One secular anti-Zionist group today is the International Jewish Anti-Zionist Network, a socialist, antiwar, anti-imperialist organization that calls for "the dismantling of Israeli apartheid return of Palestinian refugees, and the ending of the Israeli colonization of historic Palestine."

In the 2000s, leaders of the Respect Party and the Socialist Workers Party of the United Kingdom met with leaders of Hamas and Hezbollah at the Cairo Anti-war Conference. The result of the 2003 conference was a call to oppose "normalization with the Zionist entity".

Christian anti-Zionism
In April 2013 the Church of Scotland published "The Inheritance of Abraham: A Report on the Promised Land", which rejected the idea of a special right of Jewish people to the Holy Land through analysis of scripture and Jewish theological claims. According to Haaretz the report drew on the writings of anti-Zionist Jews and Christians. It was revised after being harshly criticized by Scottish Jews The revision replaced input from Mark Braverman with material from Marc H. Ellis, both Jewish.

In 2014 a controversy arose when the United States Presbyterian Church (PCUSA) published a study guide, Zionism Unsettled, quickly withdrawn from sale on its website, which asserted that the Israeli-Palestinian conflict was fueled by a pathology inherent in Zionism. The work and the Church's position was challenged as flawed, anti-Zionist and antisemitic, in an article by Cary Nelson. In 2022, the same denomination's general assembly determined that Israel was an apartheid state.

Haredi Judaism

Most Orthodox religious groups have accepted and actively support the State of Israel, even if they have not adopted the "Zionist" ideology. The World Agudath Israel party (founded in Poland) has, at times, participated in Israeli government coalitions. Most religious Zionists hold pro-Israel views from a right-wing viewpoint. The main exceptions are Hasidic groups such as Satmar Hasidim, which have about 100,000 adherents worldwide and numerous different, smaller Hasidic groups, unified in America in the Central Rabbinical Congress of the United States and Canada and Israel in the Edah HaChareidis. Many Hasidic rabbis oppose the creation of a Jewish state. The leader of the Satmar Hasidic group, Rabbi Joel Teitelbaum's book, VaYoel Moshe, published in 1959, expounded an Orthodox position for anti-Zionism based a derivation of halacha from an aggadic passage in the Babylonian Talmud's tractate Ketubot 111a. There Teitelbaum states that God and the Jewish people exchanged three oaths at the time of the Jews' exile from ancient Israel, forbidding the Jewish people from massively immigrating to the Land of Israel, and from rebelling against the nations of the world.

Anti-Zionism and antisemitism

Anti-Zionism spans a range of political, social, and religious views. According to Rony Brauman, using antisemitism as a benchmark, one can speak of three kinds of perspective regarding Zionism, pro-and-contra: a non-antisemitic anti-Zionism, an antisemitic anti-Zionism, and an antisemitic pro-Zionism. According to Shany Mor, one may also speak of anti-Zionism in three ways:
 pre-1948 Jewish anti-Zionism, which is not inherently antisemitic,
 post-1948 Arab anti-Zionism as a result of the Arab–Israeli conflict, in which some amount of antisemitism is at work,
 post-1948 anti-Zionist appeals based on universalism, in which some amount of antisemitism is at work.

In the early 21st century, it was also claimed that a "new antisemitism" had emerged that was rooted in anti-Zionism. Advocates of this notion argue that much of what purports to be criticism of Israel and Zionism is demonization, and has led to an international resurgence of attacks on Jews and Jewish symbols and an increased acceptance of antisemitic beliefs in public discourse. Critics of the concept have suggested that the characterization of anti-Zionism as antisemitic is inaccurate, sometimes obscures legitimate criticism of Israel's policies and actions and trivializes antisemitism. Professor David Myers says that the equation should not be made without "careful contextualization and delineation".

Equating and correlating anti-Zionism with antisemitism
As early as 1966, Webster's Third New International Dictionary cited anti-Zionism as one of the core meanings of antisemitism, and Martin Luther King Jr., a year latter, was cited as having made the same equation in a letter. In 1972 Abba Eban said that the task of dialogue with non-Jews is to prove that there is no distinction between antisemitism and anti-Zionism. In 1978, Fred Halliday, rebuffing the asserted equation between anti-Zionism and antisemitism, wrote that disavowals were constantly required given the frequency of the accusation. In the early 2000s, it became increasingly commonplace for defenders of Israel to regard criticism of Zionism and Israel as tantamount to, interchangeable with, or closely related to antisemitism. In 2007, Tony Judt considered the merging of the two categories in polemics relatively new. A 2003–04 European Monitoring Centre on Racism and Xenophobia report aroused intense controversy over aspects of its provisory definition of antisemitism, which many regarded as ambiguous in blurring distinctions to the point that the two concepts became porous.

Scholars who subscribe to this identity between the two include Robert S. Wistrich, former head of the Vidal Sassoon International Center for the Study of Antisemitism at the Hebrew University of Jerusalem, who argued that post-1948 anti-Zionism and antisemitism had merged and that much contemporary anti-Zionism, particularly forms that compare Zionism and Jews with Hitler and Nazi Germany, has become a form of antisemitism.

Jean Améry became convinced that anti-Zionism was an updated version of the antisemitism he experienced as a Holocaust survivor. In a 1969 essay, he argued that the anti-Zionists of his time may not have ill intentions against all Jews, but their intentions are irrelevant. The philosophy they engage in has a centuries-old pedigree beginning with the false charge of deicide and culminated in Nazi propaganda. Améry didn't expect anti-Zionists of his time to take an unbending pro-Israel stance in the complex conflict between Israelis and Palestinian. He merely beseeched them to think critically, use common sense, and judge Israel fairly.

In 2016, the International Holocaust Remembrance Alliance adopted a Working Definition of Antisemitism, one which subsequently was officially recognized by various governments, foremost among them, the United States and France, which endorsed the equation of certain manifestations of anti-Zionism with antisemitism. 127 Jewish intellectuals in the diaspora and Israel protested formally against the French resolution equating anti-Zionism with antisemitism, arguing that the definition was injurious to numerous anti-Zionist Jews.

Deborah E. Lipstadt has documented several cases of individuals who made remarks that were clearly against Jews, but when criticized, those individuals defended themselves by saying that they were against "Zionists".

Professor Kenneth L. Marcus, former staff director at the U.S. Commission on Civil Rights, identifies four main views on the relationship between anti-Zionism and antisemitism, at least in North America:(p. 845–846) Marcus also states: A study of 5,000 people in Europe in 2006 concluded that antisemitic views correlate among respondents the stronger the latters' hostility to Israel, a result which however does not mean one cannot be critical of Israeli policies without being antisemitic.

Dina Porat (head of the Institute for Study of Antisemitism and Racism at Tel-Aviv University) contends that anti-Zionism is antisemitic because it is discriminatory: "if every nation is entitled to a state, then opposing a national movement struggling for the rights of a nation to reach one is discrimination, which, in this case, originates in antisemitism." Emanuele Ottolenghi argued for the same view.

In 2010, Oxford University Press published Trials of the Diaspora: A History of Anti-Semitism in England by Anthony Julius.  In that book, Julius claims that the borders between anti-Zionism and antisemitism are porous. However, Julius makes a distinction; though it is possible to be in conflict with a Jewish ideology without discriminating against Jews, anti-Zionists cross the line so often as to make the distinction meaningless.

Professor Jeffrey Herf of the University of Maryland, College Park wrote, "One distinctive feature of the secular leftist antagonism to Israel ... was its indignant assertion that it had absolutely nothing to do with antisemitism. Yet the eagerness with which Israel's enemies spread lies about Zionism's racist nature and were willing to compare the Jewish state to Nazi Germany suggested that an element of antisemitism was indeed at work in the international Left as it responded to Israel's victory in June 1967." Anti-Zionists responded to the war's outcome by describing Israel in terms familiar from antisemitic stereotypes.

Speaking for the Anti-Defamation League, its director Jonathan Greenblatt told Isaac Chotiner of The New Yorker, "[What] many in the anti-Zionist camp want for Palestinians or would want for other peoples, they would deny to Jewish people.  Unless you don't believe in nationalism as a concept and unless you support denying the legitimacy of any national project from France to Ukraine, if you hold the idea that Zionism is the only form of nationalism that's wrong, that's discriminating against Jewish people.  That's the anti-Semitism." The American Jewish Committee expressed similar views.: "The belief that the Jews, alone among the people of the world, do not have a right to self-determination — or that the Jewish people's religious and historical connection to Israel is invalid—is inherently bigoted."

View that the two are not interlinked
Several comparative surveys in Europe and elsewhere have failed to find any statistical correlation between criticism of Israeli policies and antisemitism:
 Political scientist Peter Beattie, in an analytical overview of the specialist literature which actually used polling data in several countries to test the purported link between criticism of Israel and antisemitism found no necessary empirical correlation, cautioning that assertions of such an innate connection were calumnious. He concludes, "Most of those critical of Israeli policies are not anti-Semites. Only a fraction of the US population harbours anti-Semitic views, and while logically this fraction would be overrepresented among critics of Israel, the present and prior research indicate that they comprise only a small part. Inaccurate charges of anti-Semitism are not merely calumny, but threaten to debase the term itself and weaken its connection to a very real, and very dangerous, form of prejudice."
 The German sociologist Werner Bergmann's analysis of empirical polling data for Germany concluded that whereas right-wing respondents critical of Israel tended to have views overlapping with classical antisemitism, left-wing interviewees' criticisms of Israel did not transfer into criticism of Jews.

Former director of the Institute for Jewish Policy Research Antony Lerman argues: The anti-Zionism equals antisemitism argument drains the word antisemitism of any useful meaning. For it means that to count as an antisemite, it is sufficient to hold any view ranging from criticism of the policies of the current Israeli government to denial that Israel has the right to exist as a state, without having to subscribe to any of those things which historians have traditionally regarded as making up an antisemitic worldview: hatred of Jews per se, belief in a worldwide Jewish conspiracy, belief that Jews generated communism and control capitalism, belief that Jews are racially inferior and so on. Moreover, while theoretically allowing that criticism of Israeli governments is legitimate, in practice it virtually proscribes any such thing.

Shifting positions on the Zionist/Anti-Zionist spectrum
Before World War II and the creation of the State of Israel, the debate between Zionists and anti-Zionists was largely an internal Jewish affair; the questions the debate sought to answer involved Jewish self-definition and the proper use of political power in the Jewish diaspora. Once it became clear to most Jews that all of Zionism's alternatives failed to prevent the Holocaust, the debate largely subsided in the Jewish community. Most pre-war Jewish anti-Zionists were either killed in the Holocaust, emigrated to Israel, or became disillusioned by the Soviet Union.

Nevertheless, individual Jews have changed their position on the spectrum broaching pro- and anti-Zionist views:

Jacob Israël de Haan made aliyah to Palestine in 1919 as a convinced religious Zionist. Deeply troubled by Zionist attitudes towards Arabs, he began to champion their rights and at the same time advocated on behalf of the Orthodox Ashkenazi Agudat Israel/Haredim communities, who maintained excellent relations with Arabs, and with whom he felt more spiritually comfortable. His effectiveness with the Mandatory authorities in protesting Zionist claims to represent all Jews while they ignored dissent from within Jerusalem's anti-Zionist orthodox communities was resented. He was ridiculed by Zionists, who assassinated him in 1924.

Isaac Deutscher decidedly opposed Zionism, then altered his judgment in the wake of the Holocaust, to support the foundation of Israel – the creation of a nation-state precisely when they were becoming anachronistic – even if it was at the Palestinians' expense, and then wavered at the end between contempt for Arab states' antisemitic demagoguery and odium for Israelis' fanatical triumphalism. In "Prussians of the Middle East", at the end of the Six-Day War, he prophesied that the victory would prove to be a disaster for Israel.

Noam Chomsky is often reported to be an anti-Zionist. He himself has said that the word "Zionism" has changed connotations since his youth, with the boundaries of what are considered Zionist and anti-Zionist views shifting. The Zionist groups he led as a youth would now be called anti-Zionist because they mostly opposed the idea of a Jewish state. In 1947, in his youth, Chomsky's support for a socialist binational state, in conjunction with his opposition to any semblance of a theocratic system of governance in Israel, was at the time considered well within the mainstream of secular Zionism; by 1987, it put him solidly in the anti-Zionist camp.

Zionists have on occasion interpreted criticism from pro-Zionists in the fold as evidence that the critics are anti-Zionist. One could be opposed to the central goal of Zionism, the formation of a Jewish national state, and yet not be anti-Zionist. This was the case with some pre-state groups, political heirs of the cultural Zionism tradition founded by Ahad Ha'am, such as Brit Shalom and, later, Ihud. Hannah Arendt, who worked for the Jewish Agency for Palestine in the 1930s and was active in facilitating Jewish migration to Palestine from France, devoted much of her thinking in the 1940s to a critique of political Zionism. The Zionism she advocated had a broader definition: Jewish political agency anywhere. When partition was imminent, she came out strongly against the concept of a Jewish, as opposed to binational, state. While writing Eichmann in Jerusalem, she clarified her views: "I am not against Israel on principle, I am against certain important Israeli policies." Arendt took Israel's side in the Arab–Israeli conflict and rejoiced at its victory in the Six-Day War.

Conspiracy theories

The Protocols of the Elders of Zion came to be exploited by Arab anti-Zionists, although some have tried to discourage its usage.  The Protocols itself makes no reference to Zionism, but after World War I, claims that the book is a record of the Zionist Congress became routine.  The first Arabic translation of The Protocols was published in 1925, contemporaneous with a major wave of Jewish immigration to Palestine. A similar conspiracy theory is belief in a powerful, well-financed "Zionist lobby" that clamps down on criticism of Israel and conceals its crimes. Zionists are able to do this in the United Kingdom, according to Shelby Tucker and Tim Llewellyn, because they are in "control of our media" and "suborned Britain's civil structures, including government, parliament, and the press."

Anti-Zionism is a major component of Holocaust denial.  One strain of Holocaust denial states that Zionists cooperated with the Nazis and charges Zionism with guilt for the crimes committed during the Holocaust. Deniers see Israel as having somehow benefitting from what they refer to as "the big lie" that is the Holocaust. Some Holocaust deniers claim that their ideology is motivated by concern for Palestinian rights.

See also

Notes

Citations

Sources

External links

 The Other Israel: The Radical Case Against Zionism – essays by members of Matzpen
 Lawrence Davidson Lawrence Davidson, The Present State of Anti-Semitism, Logos, Issue 9.1, (Winter 2010)
 True Torah Jews Against Zionism
 Jews Confront Zionism by Daniel Lange/Levitsky, Monthly Review, June 2009

 
History of Zionism
Political theories